A portfolio school is a higher-learning institution that trains students for a career in advertising, specifically the disciplines of graphic design, art direction, copywriting, or art. Students expect to be educated on advertising techniques and make professional connections. Rather than receiving a certification (or, sometimes, in addition to receiving a certification) graduates leave with a completed career portfolio that includes samples of their creative work and placement help in their very first ad agency. 

Mary Warlick, of The One Club, described portfolio schools as "finishing schools" for advertisers.

Instructors and learning programs

Instructors at portfolio schools are typically advertising industry professionals capable of providing practical insights into the processes and practices of the advertising industry. Students are not expected to have completed any amount of a college or university education before attending, although many portfolio school students do attend a 4-year college or university before attending. Portfolio schools have no standardized program length, and a full program can last between one and two years.

Schools

Portfolio school options are limited in the US and abroad. There are more small courses and programs, but only a few comprehensive options. 

Major advertising portfolio programs in the US:

 Denver Ad School in Denver, CO
 Miami Ad School in Atlanta, GA / Miami, FL / New York City, NY / San Francisco, CA
 VCU Brandcenter in Richmond, VA

Major advertising portfolio programs outside the US:

 Miami Ad School in Berlin / Buenos Aires / Madrid / Mexico City / Mumbai / Punta Cana / Rio de Janeiro / Sao Paulo / Sydney / Toronto / Sri Lanka
 School of Communication Arts in London

Criticism

Critics of the portfolio school concept have suggested that similar professional experience can be gained through volunteer work, internships and opportunities and that completion of a portfolio school program isn't necessary for career advancement in advertising.

See also
Technical school
Advertising

References

School types
Advertising